Maillot is the French word for jersey (sports), as well as for swimsuit, and may refer to:

 maillot, swimsuit

Places 
 Maillot, Yonne, town in France
 Neuilly - Porte Maillot (Paris RER), metro station in Paris, France
 Porte Maillot (Paris Métro), metro station in Paris, France
 Theuville-aux-Maillots, French commune in the Seine-Maritime département

Sports 
 Maillot jaune (yellow jersey), maillot vert (green jersey), maillot à pois rouges (polka dot jersey), or maillot blanc (white jersey): colors of the jerseys worn by the leader of each classification in the Tour de France
 Prix de la Porte Maillot, Group 3 flat horse race in France
 Pour Un Maillot Jaune, Title of a documentary about the 1965 Tour de France

People 
 Frédéric Maillot, French politician from Réunion
 Jean-Christophe Maillot (born 1960), French dancer and choreographer 
 Henri Maillot (1928-1956), pied noir member of the Algerian Communist Party
 Members of the Maillot de la Treille line:
 Nicolas Maillot de la Treille (1725–1794), theologian
 Nikolaus Freiherr von Maillot de la Treille (1774–1834), Bavarian general and war minister